Someone Like You is a collection of short stories by Roald Dahl.  It was published in 1953 by Alfred Knopf.

Contents
It contains eighteen short stories. The final four are grouped under a collective title.
 "Taste"
 "Lamb to the Slaughter"
 "Man from the South"
 "The Soldier"
 "My Lady Love, My Dove"
 "Dip in the Pool"
 "Galloping Foxley"
 "Skin"
 "Poison"
 "The Wish"
 "Neck"
 "The Sound Machine"
 "Nunc Dimittis"
 "The Great Automatic Grammatizator" (republished as The Great Automatic Grammatizator anthology)
 "Claude's Dog"
"The Ratcatcher"
 "Rummins"
 "Mr. Feasey"
 "Mr. Hoddy"

Reception
Groff Conklin called Someone Like You "certainly the most distinguished book of short stories of 1953 ... all superb". Anthony Boucher and J. Francis McComas praised the collection's "subtly devastating murder stories [as well as] two biting science-fantasties, plus a few unclassifiable gems" and concluded the volume "belong[ed] on your shelves somewhere in the Beerbohm/Collier/Saki section".

Van Morrison's song Someone Like You is named after this collection.

Awards
 Edgar Award, 1954

References

Further reading

1953 short story collections
Short story collections by Roald Dahl
Edgar Award-winning works
Alfred A. Knopf books